Lo Barnechea is a commune located in the northeastern sector of the province of Santiago and its area corresponds to 48% of this province. Its urban boundaries are: to the north with Los Andes of the Valparaíso region, to the west with Colina, to the southwest with Vitacura and Huechuraba, to the south with Las Condes and to the east with San José de Maipo. It developed around the old rural town of Lo Barnechea. Its population is heterogeneous, as it is inhabited by high and medium-high income families in sectors such as La Dehesa, Los Trapenses and El Arrayán, and also by medium-low and low income families, mainly in the town of Lo Barnechea, Población La Ermita and Cerro Dieciocho.

History 

 
Lo Barnechea has had a long human occupation for thousands of years. Before the Incas, it was occupied by the Llolleo culture and the Bato tradition, and after them, the Aconcagua culture, the Promaucaes, the Incas and later the Spanish occupation.

Its pre-Hispanic inhabitants were called huaicoches (in Mapudungún: waykoche 'people who live in a landslide zone') because of the huaicos or huaycos of the region (in Quechua: wayqu 'stream'). Also called lloclla (in Quechua: lluqlla 'alluvium'), these are violent alluvial floods in which a large amount of material from the slopes is dislodged and dragged by the water downstream to the bottom of the valleys, causing enormous burial sites in its path. In modern scientific terms, according to the Multinational Andean Project, a huayco is known as a debris flow, or debris flow. A huayco is caused by the violent fall of water, which drags mud, stones, trees and anything else in its path. Its origin may be due to an intense rainfall or the overflowing of a river or lagoon at high altitudes.

The town of Lo Barnechea was created in the 19th century. So far, it has resisted the conurbation with Greater Santiago.

The DFL 1-3260 of 9 March 1981, establishes the new commune of Lo Barnechea, from a subdivision of the commune of Las Condes, however until 1991, it was part of the communal grouping managed by the Municipality of Las Condes. By Decree with Force of Law No. 32-18.992 of 20 May 1991, the Municipality of Lo Barnechea was officially established, the same day as its neighbor Vitacura.

Geography

Terrain

Rivers 
 Mapocho River
 San Francisco
 Molina River

Stream 
 El Arrayán Stream (Nature Sanctuary)
 El Carrizo Stream
 El Gabino Stream
 El Guindo Stream
 El Manzano Stream
 Las Hualtatas Stream
 Las Rosas Stream

Creeks 
 El Culén Creek
 El Ají Creek
 El Guindo Creek
 El Peumo Creek
 Huallalolén Creek
 La Carbonera Creek
 Las Ñipas Creek
 Las Zorras Creek
 Los Chanchos Creek

Cityscape 

The urban center of Lo Barnechea is located in the areas below 1,000 meters above sea level, in the basin of the Mapocho River and the valley of La Dehesa. Its neighborhoods are composed of affluent sectors such as Los Trapenses, La Dehesa and El Huinganal (Molle Schinus polygamus, in Mapudungún Huingan), El Tranque, and middle class sectors such as the traditional Pueblo de Lo Barnechea, Cerro 18, San Enrique and El Arrayán.

Many of its streets recall the old alleys owned by the seven founding families. El León Street recalls the old Parador and Hostería de El León, which used to welcome miners after their long days of work. On this street lived the Salfate sisters, now deceased, who knew the history of the town and its inhabitants: Blanca and Irene Griselda. Their stories about the mythical trips to the Laguna del Viento in the foothills of the Andes and the local mythology enlivened the village's social gatherings in the afternoons.

Towards the northwest there are neighborhoods with Spanish names: the Chin street that remembers the owner of the parcel with the surname Echeñique. In the Trapenses area, many of the landmarks of this congregation, which for many years was in this commune before selling its land for the capital gain, are remembered. Currently, at the end of the Trapenses there is a road that connects La Dehesa with the Chicureo sector and at the end of the road El Golf de Manquehue connects it with the unpopulated area of Huechuraba.

Economy 
In 2018, the number of registered companies in Lo Barnechea was 10,072. The Economic Complexity Index (ECI) in the same year was 1.01, while the economic activities with the highest Revealed Comparative Advantage (RCA) index were Retail Sale of Underwear and Personal Wear (42.14), Dance Instructors (27.49) and Amusement Parks and Similar Centers Activities (18.79).

Demographics
Of these, 72,496 (97%) lived in urban areas and 2,253 (3%) in rural areas. The population grew by 49.3% (24,687 persons) between the 1992 and 2002 censuses. The 2006 projected population was 103,376.

Administration

Municipality 
The Municipality of Lo Barnechea is headed for the 2021-2024 period by Mayor Juan Cristóbal Lira Ibáñez (UDI), who is advised by the councilors:

 Juana Mir Balmaceda (Evópoli)
 Cristian Daly Dagorret (RN)
 Michael Comber Vial (RN)
 María Teresa Urrutia Greve (UDI)
 Paulette Guiloff Hes (Evópoli)
 Benjamín Errazuriz Palacios (REP)
 Rodrigo Arellano Falcon (UDI)
 Francisco Madrid Vera (Independent)

Parliamentary representation 
Lo Barnechea belongs to Electoral District No. 11 together with the municipalities of Las Condes, Vitacura, La Reina and Peñalolén and to the VII Senatorial District (Santiago Metropolitan Region).

It is represented in the Chamber of Deputies of the National Congress for the 2018-2022 term by the following deputies:
 Catalina Del Real Mihovilovic (RN).
 Gonzalo Fuenzalida Figueroa (RN).
 Karin Luck Urban (RN).
 Guillermo Ramírez Diez (UDI).
 Francisco Undurraga Gazitúa (Evópoli). 
 Tomás Hirsch Goldschmidt (AH). 
In the Senate, Carlos Montes of the PS and Manuel José Ossandón of the RN will represent it for the 2014-2022 term.

Architecture 

The architecture in the area of buildings is very scarce, with a few late colonial style houses located preferably in the so-called Pueblo de Lo Barnechea. As regards the commercial area, there are the shopping centers Portal La Dehesa, Espacio Urbano La Dehesa, Paseo Los Trapenses and Mall Vivo Los Trapenses. Also noteworthy is the large number of mansions and luxury homes that are established in this commune, especially in the sectors of Arrayán, Los Trapenses and La Dehesa, being these of various styles built mainly during the last twenty years and belonging to the so-called "upper class" of the country, making up one of the areas with the highest average housing prices in Chile. 

In parallel to the construction of houses and luxury apartments, social housing was developed in Lo Barnechea, in addition to the processes of self-construction of the founding tenants of the town, along with their generations. For the same reason, in the commune of Lo Barnechea we can see a series of contrasts, not only architectural, but also of social character, given that in a few square meters, or crossing a street (Padre Alfredo Arteaga Barros with Comandante Malbec), neighborhoods of high socioeconomic strata can be seen, in opposition to sectors of low social strata, clearly delimited between them.

Transportation 
The commune has a low connection to the interconnected public transport of the city, consequently and being located at one end of the metropolitan area, together with Vitacura it leads the rate of motorization per capita (motor vehicles per inhabitant) in Greater Santiago. It was expected that by 2020, Lo Barnechea will have 3 stations of the Las Condes Tramway, which would give it a historic connection to the Santiago Metro, being currently one of the three communes of Greater Santiago (along with La Pintana and Lo Espejo) that does not have stations of the metropolitan railroad. However, the project was canceled by the authorities for not having the necessary subsidies for its execution.

Lo Barnechea was also part of the Transantiago feeder zone C, together with the districts of Providencia, Las Condes and Vitacura. It is currently served by units 4 and 6 of this transportation system.

There is an elevator on Cerro 18 operated by the Municipality of Lo Barnechea that connects this sector with Los Quincheros Street and the top of the hill, where the Parque de la Chilenidad is located.

Climate 

In general terms, Lo Barnechea participates in the semi-arid Mediterranean climate that affects the Metropolitan Region, characterized by a prolonged dry season and a winter season, which concentrates annual rainfall. 

 Annual rainfall 360 mm
 Average temperature 14 °C
 Average Maximum Temperature 22 °C
 Average Minimum Temperature 7 °C

These climatic patterns present, in this commune, very important variations due to its condition as a foothill area, subjected to the altitude factor. It is estimated that in a mountainous environment, rainfall increases by about 22 mm every 100 m of altitude, while the temperature decreases by about 0.5 °C every 100 m. According to this, being the urban area of the town of Lo Barnechea located at 850 m a.s.l., it receives 65 mm more rainfall than in the commune of Santiago. This varies according to the size of the rural territory of the commune. In the annual distribution of rainfall, and considering the entire mountainous area, when it rains several days in a row, large flows are produced in the riverbeds, which causes flooding by accumulation and its consequent transfer according to slopes (1982-84-87). The impact was regrettable, with loss of life, interruption of activities, damage to infrastructure and equipment, due to the permanence of inhabitants on the banks of the Mapocho River.

In addition to the reality of the Mapocho River and its location, there is a natural climatic event that will have to be taken into account in planning the future population of the Commune.

Flood of 1982 

The incursion of warm winter fronts in 1982 caused a rise in the lower limit of the snowpack, from 1800 to 2400 m above sea level, generating a large increase in the volume of water and sediment runoff, resulting from the melting of snow, which caused saturation and subsequent overflow of the natural and artificial water drainage systems.

The repetition of a similar event, under the current conditions of occupation and urban expansion in Lo Barnechea, could cause even more catastrophic situations, due to the high degree of intervention and modification to which the natural system has been subjected by the construction that has taken place on increasingly higher ground.

Education

Higher Education 
 Andrés Bello National University
 Universidad del Desarrollo
 University of Chile
 La Universidad de Chile se presenta en la comuna con su Campus este de la Facultad de Medicina, el que mantiene el Centro de Salud SERJOVEN, que al año proporciona atención gratuita a más de 1000 adolescentes de escasos recursos de Lo Barnechea.
 Culinary Institute
 CPEIP
 Centro de Perfeccionamiento, Experimentación e Investigaciones Pedagógicas del Ministerio de Educación.

Municipal Schools 
 Colegio Diferencial Madre Tierra
 Colegio de Adultos Fermín Vivaceta
 Colegio Farellones
Colegio Lo Barnechea with three campuses:
Eduardo Cuevas Valdes Campus (Early childhood, pre-kindergarten through 2nd grade)
San José Campus (Intermediate, 3rd through 6th grade) 
Instituto Estados Americanos Campus (from 7th to 4th grade Polyvalent)

Subsidized Schools 
 Colegio Polivalente San Rafael
 Colegio Parroquial Santa Rosa
 Centro Educacional San Esteban Mártir
 Colegio Betterland School
 Colegio San Juan de Kronstandt

Private Schools 
Craighouse School
 Colegio Nido de Águilas
 Colegio Everest
 Santiago College
 Colegio Monte Tabor y Nazaret 
The Southland School
 Colegio Newland 
 The Mayflower School
Colegio Huinganal
 Colegio los Alerces
 Huelquén Montessori
 Instituto Hebreo
 Maimonides School
 Linconl International Academy
 Bertrait College
 Anglo American International School
 Japanese Language Institute (サンチャゴ日本人学校), a Japanese school overseas

Soccer 
Currently, Lo Barnechea is home to two soccer teams that participate in official competitions, one at the professional level and one at the amateur level.

Sister cities 
  Tyler, Texas, United States
  Guayaquil, Ecuador

See also 
History
 Huaico
 Huaicoche
 
Localities
 Los Trapenses

 Pueblo Lo Barnechea
 Corral Quemado (Chile)
 El Arrayán
 La Ermita
Entidades y personas
 Cuerpo de Bomberos de Santiago
 Doña Tina
 Barnechea Fútbol Club
 Pollo al Coñac
 Consuelo Michaeli
 El Mesón de la Patagonia
 Leontina Santibáñez
 Portal La Dehesa
 International School Nido de Águilas

Notes

References

Bibliography 

 León Echáiz, René. ÑuÑohue, Historia de Ñuñoa, Providencia, Las Condes, Vitacura y La Reina, Editorial Francisco de Aguirre, primera edición, 1972.
 Piwonka Figueroa, Gonzalo. Las aguas de Santiago de Chile, 1541-1999.

External links 
 I. Municipality of Lo Barnechea
 Lo Barnechea Cultural Corporation
 Lo Barnechea Virtual Community
 Lo Barnechea community indicators in the Library of the National Congress of Chile

Populated places in Santiago Province, Chile
Geography of Santiago, Chile
Communes of Chile